Sebastian Eisenlauer (born 13 March 1990) is a retired German cross-country skier.

Eisenlauer competed at the 2014 Winter Olympics for Germany. He placed 35th in the qualifying round in the sprint, failing to advance to the knockout stages.

As of April 2014, his best showing at the World Championships is 43rd, in the classical sprint event in 2013.

Eisenlauer made his World Cup debut in December 2010. As of April 2014, his best finish is a sixth, in a classical team sprint event at Nove Mesto in 2013–14. His best individual finish is seventh, in a Tour de Ski freestyle sprint race at Oberhof in 2013–14. His best World Cup overall finish is 34th, in 2015–16. His best World Cup finish in a discipline is 22nd, in the 2013–14 sprint.

In March 2021, he announced his retirement from cross-country skiing.

Cross-country skiing results
All results are sourced from the International Ski Federation (FIS).

Olympic Games

World Championships

World Cup

Season standings

References

External links

1990 births
Living people
Olympic cross-country skiers of Germany
Cross-country skiers at the 2014 Winter Olympics
Cross-country skiers at the 2018 Winter Olympics
People from Sonthofen
Sportspeople from Swabia (Bavaria)
German male cross-country skiers
Tour de Ski skiers
21st-century German people